Şebnem Taşkan (born 26 October 1994) is a Turkish-German football midfielder currently playing in the German 2nd Women's Football Bundesliga North for Bramfelder SV. She is a member of the Turkey women's national team.

Playing career

Club
She plays for Bramfelder SV in the German 2nd Women's Football Bundesliga North.

International
She was admitted to the Turkey women's national team and debuted internationally  on 6 April 2017 in the 2019 FIFA Women's World Cup qualification – UEFA preliminary round – Group 4 match against Montenegro.

References

Living people
1994 births
Footballers from Hamburg
German people of Turkish descent
German women's footballers
Turkish women's footballers
Turkey women's international footballers
Women's association football midfielders
2. Frauen-Bundesliga players